Dioryctria robiniella is a species of snout moth in the genus Dioryctria. It was described by Pierre Millière in 1865, and is known from France, Spain, Croatia and Italy.

The wingspan is 21–22 mm.

References

Moths described in 1865
robiniella
Moths of Europe